The 2022 World Tennis League was a non-ATP/WTA-affiliated exhibition mixed-gender team tennis tournament. It was the inaugural edition of the World Tennis League. The event was held on hard court at the Coca-Cola Arena in Dubai, United Arab Emirates from 19 until 24 December 2022.

Team Hawks, composed of Alexander Zverev, Elena Rybakina, Dominic Thiem and Anastasia Pavlyuchenkova, won the title, after defeating Team Kites (Félix Auger-Aliassime, Iga Świątek, Holger Rune and Sania Mirza) in the final, 32-25.

Format
18 players were drawn into four teams (Falcons, Eagles, Kites, Hawks). The teams played each other in a round-robin format that consist of one men’s singles match, one women’s singles match and a mixed doubles match. They got one point for each game they win in a tie, plus one bonus point for a win in a third-set match tiebreak and five bonus points for winning the tie. Following the round-robin phase, the top two teams faced off in the final on 24 December 2022.

Teams and players

Results

Standings
A team received 5 bonus points for each tie won and 1 bonus point for each third-set match tiebreak won. The top two teams qualified for the final.

Final

References

External links
Official website

2022 tennis exhibitions
2022 in Emirati tennis
Mixed doubles tennis
December 2022 sports events in the United Arab Emirates